The Gloster F.9/37, also known as the Gloster G.39, was a British twin-engined design from the Gloster Aircraft Company for a cannon-armed heavy fighter to serve with the Royal Air Force, planned before the Second World War. The F.9/37 was rejected in favour of other designs.

A development of the F.9/37 as a night fighter, for a new Air Ministry Specifications F.29/40 – known unofficially as the Gloster Reaper – was dropped so that Gloster could concentrate on existing work and on the nascent British jet projects.

Design and development
Gloster had designed a twin-engined turret-fighter for specification F.34/35 but the single-engined Boulton Paul Defiant for F.9/35 was seen to cover both requirements and the F.34/35 design dropped. Less than two years later, F.9/37 for a "twin-engined single-seat fighter with fixed armament" was issued. The F.9/37 was designed under the direction of George Carter, his first for Gloster, to  F.9/37 (hence the name) as a single-seat fighter carrying an armament of four 0.303 in (7.7 mm) Browning machine guns and two 20 mm Hispano cannon in the nose. Intended for dispersed production by semi-skilled labour, the structure broke down into sub-assemblies.

A prototype (military serial L7999) with 1,060 hp Bristol Taurus T-S(a) radial engines flew on 3 April 1939 and demonstrated excellent performance, its maximum speed of  being the best recorded by a British fighter at the time. Test flights revealed that the prototype was very manoeuvrable and "a delight to fly". After being badly damaged in a landing accident in July 1939, it was re-engined with 900 hp Taurus T-S(a)-IIIs in 1940, which reduced its performance.

F.18/40 and F.29/40
Specification F.18/40, for a specialist night fighter, with nose- and turret-mounted guns, led to Gloster submitting a design based on the F.9/37, fitted with Rolls-Royce Merlin engines, a dorsal four-gun turret and Airborne Interception (AI) radar. This received support from the Air Staff who saw it as superior to the Bristol Beaufighter and the Air Ministry ordered one of the F.9/37 prototypes to be converted to the new specification as F.29/40. Unofficially known as the Gloster Reaper, it inherited the admirable handling characteristics of the F.9/37 and despite being judged superior to other designs, including turreted variants of the Beaufighter and de Havilland Mosquito, the Reaper was terminated in May 1941, for Gloster to concentrate on other work, especially the Gloster E.28/39 jet aircraft.

Specifications (L7999: Taurus engine)

See also

Footnotes

Bibliography

Further reading

External links

 Gloster F.9/37 – British Aircraft Directory
 "Mars to Javelin" by H. F. King, Flight, pp. 713–731.

F.9 37
1930s British fighter aircraft
Cancelled military aircraft projects of the United Kingdom
Turret fighters
Low-wing aircraft
Aircraft first flown in 1939
Twin piston-engined tractor aircraft